NuSTAR (Nuclear Spectroscopic Telescope Array, also named Explorer 93 and SMEX-11) is a NASA space-based X-ray telescope that uses a conical approximation to a Wolter telescope to focus high energy X-rays from astrophysical sources, especially for nuclear spectroscopy, and operates in the range of 3 to 79 keV.

NuSTAR is the eleventh mission of NASA's Small Explorer (SMEX-11) satellite program and the first space-based direct-imaging X-ray telescope at energies beyond those of the Chandra X-ray Observatory and XMM-Newton. It was successfully launched on 13 June 2012, having previously been delayed from 21 March 2012 due to software issues with the launch vehicle.

The mission's primary scientific goals are to conduct a deep survey for black holes a billion times more massive than the Sun, to investigate how particles are accelerated to very high energy in active galaxies, and to understand how the elements are created in the explosions of massive stars by imaging supernova remnants.

Having completed a two-year primary mission, NuSTAR is in its  year of operation.

History 
NuSTAR's predecessor, the High Energy Focusing Telescope (HEFT), was a balloon-borne version that carried telescopes and detectors constructed using similar technologies. In February 2003, NASA issued an Explorer program Announcement of Opportunity (AoO). In response, NuSTAR was submitted to NASA in May 2003, as one of 36 mission proposals vying to be the tenth and eleventh Small Explorer missions. In November 2003, NASA selected NuSTAR and four other proposals for a five-month implementation feasibility study.

In January 2005, NASA selected NuSTAR for flight pending a one-year feasibility study. The program was cancelled in February 2006 as a result of cuts to science in NASA's 2007 budget. On 21 September 2007, it was announced that the program had been restarted, with an expected launch in August 2011, though this was later delayed to June 2012.

The principal investigator is Fiona A. Harrison of the California Institute of Technology (Caltech). Other major partners include the Jet Propulsion Laboratory (JPL), University of California, Berkeley, Technical University of Denmark (DTU), Columbia University, Goddard Space Flight Center (GSFC), Stanford University, University of California, Santa Cruz, Sonoma State University, Lawrence Livermore National Laboratory, and the Italian Space Agency (ASI). NuSTAR's major industrial partners include Orbital Sciences Corporation and ATK Space Components.

Launch 
NASA contracted with Orbital Sciences Corporation to launch NuSTAR (mass ) on a Pegasus XL launch vehicle on 21 March 2012. It had earlier been planned for 15 August 2011, 3 February 2012, 16 March 2012, and 14 March 2012. After a launch meeting on 15 March 2012, the launch was pushed further back to allow time to review flight software used by the launch vehicle's flight computer. The Pegasus launch vehicle was dropped from the L-1011 'Stargazer' aircraft.

On 22 June 2012, it was confirmed that the  mast was fully deployed.

Optics 

Unlike visible light telescopes – which employ mirrors or lenses working with normal incidence – NuSTAR has to employ grazing incidence optics to be able to focus X-rays. For this two conical approximation Wolter telescope design optics with  focal length are held at the end of a long deployable mast. A laser metrology system is used to determine the exact relative positions of the optics and the focal plane at all times, so that each detected photon can be mapped back to the correct point on the sky even if the optics and the focal plane move relative to one another during an exposure.

Each focusing optic consists of 133 concentric shells. One particular innovation enabling NuSTAR is that these shells are coated with depth-graded multilayers (alternating atomically thin layers of a high-density and low-density material); with NuSTAR's choice of Pt/SiC and W/Si multilayers, this enables reflectivity up to 79 keV (the platinum K-edge energy).

The optics were produced, at Goddard Space Flight Center, by heating thin sheets of flexible glass in an oven so that they slumped over precision-polished cylindrical quartz mandrels of the appropriate radius. The coatings were applied by a group at the Danish Technical University.

The shells were then assembled, at the Nevis Laboratories of Columbia University, using graphite spacers machined to constrain the glass to the conical shape, and held together by epoxy. There are 4680 mirror segments in total (the 65 inner shells each comprise six segments and the 65 outer shells twelve; there are upper and lower segments to each shell, and there are two telescopes); there are five spacers per segment. Since the epoxy takes 24 hours to cure, one shell is assembled per day – it took four months to build up one optic.

The expected point spread function for the flight mirrors is 43 arcseconds, giving a spot size of about two millimeters at the focal plane; this is unprecedentedly good resolution for focusing hard X-ray optics, though it is about one hundred times worse than the best resolution achieved at longer wavelengths by the Chandra X-ray Observatory.

Detectors 

Each focusing optic has its own focal plane module, consisting of a solid state cadmium zinc telluride (CdZnTe) pixel detector surrounded by a cesium iodide (CsI) anti-coincidence shield. One detector unit — or focal plane — comprises four (two-by-two) detectors, manufactured by eV Products. Each detector is a rectangular crystal of dimension  and thickness ~ that have been gridded into  pixels (each pixel subtending 12.3 arcseconds) and provides a total of 12 arcminutes field of view (FoV) for each focal plane module.

The cadmium zinc telluride (CdZnTe) detectors are state of the art room temperature semiconductors that are very efficient at turning high energy photons into electrons. The electrons are digitally recorded using custom application-specific integrated circuits (ASICs) designed by the NuSTAR California Institute of Technology (CalTech) Focal Plane Team. Each pixel has an independent discriminator and individual X-ray interactions trigger the readout process. On-board processors, one for each telescope, identify the row and column with the largest pulse height and read out pulse height information from this pixel as well as its eight neighbors. The event time is recorded to an accuracy of 2 μs relative to the on-board clock. The event location, energy, and depth of interaction in the detector are computed from the nine-pixel signals.

The focal planes are shielded by cesium iodide (CsI) crystals that surround the detector housings. The crystal shields, grown by Saint-Gobain, register high energy photons and cosmic rays which cross the focal plane from directions other than the along the NuSTAR optical axis. Such events are the primary background for NuSTAR and must be properly identified and subtracted in order to identify high energy photons from cosmic sources. The NuSTAR active shielding ensures that any CZT detector event coincident with an active shield event is ignored.

Major scientific results 
NuSTAR has demonstrated its versatility, opening the way to many new discoveries in a wide variety of areas of astrophysical research since its launch.

Spin measurement of a supermassive black hole 
In February 2013, NASA revealed that NuSTAR, along with the XMM-Newton space observatory, has measured the spin rate of the supermassive black hole at the center of the galaxy NGC 1365.

Tracing radioactivity in a supernova remnant 

One of NuSTAR's main goals is to characterize stars' explosions by mapping the radioactive material in a supernova remnants. The NuSTAR map of Cassiopeia A shows the titanium-44 isotope concentrated in clumps at the remnant's center and points to a possible solution to the mystery of how the star exploded. When researchers simulate supernova blasts with computers, as a massive star dies and collapses, the main shock wave often stalls and the star fails to shatter. The latest findings strongly suggest the exploding star literally sloshed around, re-energizing the stalled shock wave and allowing the star to finally blast off its outer layers.

Nearby supermassive black holes 
In January 2017, researchers from Durham University and the University of Southampton, leading a coalition of agencies using NuSTAR data, announced the discovery of supermassive black holes at the center of nearby galaxies NGC 1448 and IC 3639.

See also 

 Explorer program
 Gravity and Extreme Magnetism, hard X-ray telescope measuring polarization (cancelled 2012)
 James Webb Space Telescope, infrared telescope launched on 25 December 2021
 List of X-ray space telescopes
 XRISM, joint Japanese and American X-ray telescope under development

References

External links 

 NuSTAR website at nasa.gov
 NuSTAR website at caltech.edu
 Building, Launching, and Using the NuSTAR X-ray Observatory, talk by Melania Nynka of the MIT Kavli Institute for Astrophysics and Space Research

Further reading
 
 

X-ray telescopes
Explorers Program
Space telescopes
Spacecraft launched in 2012
Spacecraft launched by Pegasus rockets